Danny Way (born April 15, 1974) is an American professional skateboarder, company owner and rallycross driver who has been awarded Thrasher magazine's "Skater of the Year" award twice. He is known for extreme stunts, such as jumping into a skateboard ramp from a helicopter; that was featured on the cover of Transworld Skateboarding magazine. One of his more notable stunts was jumping the Great Wall of China on a skateboard via megaramp.

Early life
Way was born in Portland, Oregon and grew up in San Diego, California. His childhood was marred by difficult circumstances. His father, Dennis Way, died before Danny's first birthday – Dennis was jailed for failing to pay child support to his previous wife, and after nine days in jail was found hanged in his cell; his death was ruled a suicide. Following his father's death, his mother Mary dated a number of men who abused Mary, Danny, and his brother Damon. Mary subsequently remarried, to Tim O'Dea, who introduced Danny and Damon to skateboarding and surfing. The couple subsequently divorced and Tim died following a surfing session. Danny lost another adult in his life when his childhood mentor Mike Ternasky was killed by an elderly driver who ran a stop sign.

Professional skateboarding
Danny Way became the youngest person (15 yrs old) to win a pro vert skateboarding contest at the World Skateboard Association Pro Vert Contest in Lansing, Michigan sponsored by Modern Skate & Surf in 1989.  Way was introduced in the Powell Peralta skateboard company's video "Public Domain" in the late 80's and H-Street skateboard company's videos Shackle Me Not and Hokus Pokus and, shortly afterwards in 1991, co-founded the skateboard company Plan B, together with Mike Ternasky. He has been injured repeatedly, including breaking his neck in 1994, and as of 2009 having undergone 13 operations.

Plan B (1991–1998)
The Plan B company was formed as part of the Dwindle Distribution company, at that time overseen by Steve Rocco and Rodney Mullen, and, like Way, Ternasky was also formerly with H-Street, where he co-managed the company with Tony Magnusson. Ternasky, to the dismay of Magnusson, managed to convince numerous H-Street team riders to resign and assist with the development of the new brand. Ternasky's intention was to create a "super team" with riders such as Way, Colin McKay, Mullen, Mike Carroll, Matt Hensley, Rick Howard and Tas Pappas.

Alien Workshop (1999-2004)
After the original iteration of Plan B folded in 1998, Danny was sponsored by Alien Workshop. During his time with the company, Way had numerous pro model boards and was featured in photo advertisements. He also competed in the OP King of Skate competition.

DC Shoes (1994-present)
Danny was the first pro skateboarder for DC Shoes when the brand was founded in 1994. In the first advertisement for his first pro model shoe, Way stood still because he suffered a neck injury while surfing.

Plan B (2005–onwards)

Around 2005, rumors emerged in regard to a plan, devised by Way and McKay, to relaunch Plan B. Second-phase team member Paul Rodriguez has referred to this period as a time when Way and McKay were talking about "bringing back the dream; awakening the giant", while fellow recruit PJ Ladd has stated, "I had heard about it. That there was like a rumor that Plan B was maybe gonna come back and I think it had gotten around how much a fan of it I was as a kid."

In 2005, with the financial backing of Syndrome Distribution, Way and McKay reformed Plan B Skateboards, maintaining their roles as company co-owners, as well as professional skaters. Way has explained, "For the sake of what we were a part of, I think Colin and I, you know, didn't want to let go of the formula that gave us the motivation that pumped out all of those videos and stuff that we were able to pump out." Way has revealed that, while he and McKay are the co-owners of the relaunched company, they have adopted the business model that they learned of from Ternasky during his time running the first phase of the company.

In January 2013, Way provided his perspective on the company's team in an interview for the online magazine, Jenkem:

"They are doing the best tricks consistently with every variation of it down the biggest stuff. And it doesn’t take them long, so they have a lot of it. For example when we went to China recently, Sheckler alone has more footage from his 1 trip than all of the Girl team from their China trips combined. I’m not trying to diss on Girl, just trying to put it in perspective, what I think his strengths are. Torey same thing."

Sponsorship
As of March 2013, Way is sponsored by the Independent Truck Company, DC Shoes, Pacific Drive, Plan B skateboards (he is the co-owner with McKay), Nixon, MegaRamp, Capix, and ASEC. Way's brother Damon Way co-founded the DC Shoes company with Ken Block.

Reflections
In 2013 Way reflected on the changes that he has observed over more than twenty years of skateboarding:

"I think there’s different level of appreciation now. Back then there was a lot less to go around in the world of skateboarding. Less pros, fewer places to skate… Every little thing that we accomplished, if it was finding a new skate spot, or getting to the skate park, or getting a new board, was such a big deal. Let alone getting sponsored and maybe one day getting paid for skateboarding. Back then a top pro, potentially made $100,000 a year and that was like the one top dude. Maybe Tony was making a hundred grand a year in his hey-day in the mid to late eighties. And that was like, I thought he was like a rock star, you know? Skateboarding seemed so much more special in some ways back then. How the community was so passionate about skateboarding because if you weren’t, there really wasn’t much within it for you."

As the first and only person to ollie over the Great Wall of China (in 2005), Way provided insight into his mental preparation on the day in a 2013 interview:

"There were a lot of things that made it a lot more eerie to do something in China versus somewhere else. There was some uncertainty, being in a foreign place with not a lot of resources that I would say I would be comfortable with on a medical level. Aside from that, the structure was not very sound. It was literally moving side to side at least six inches from one side to the other from the wind. So I was definitely humbled by a lot more than what I was going to do on a skateboard that day. I don’t think it’s a ritual for me, but I tried to have a moment to think about all the good things in my life. That definitely made me check in with myself for a second. I usually reflect on my mentors as well. I try to envision my mentors giving me positive feedback."

Awards and achievements
 1986: Winner of the first contest he entered at eleven years of age
 1989: Winner of the first vert contest he entered in Michigan, United States
 1991: Thrasher magazine "Skater of the Year"
 1997: World record for "Biggest Air" –  kickflip
 1997: First skateboarder to drop into a ramp from a helicopter
 2002: World record for "Long Distance Jump" – 
 2003: Second world record for "Long Distance Jump" on June 19 at the Point X Camp mega ramp – surpassed his own previous record with a distance of 
 2004: Gold medal at X Games
 2004: Third world record for "Long Distance Jump" on June 19 at X Games – surpassed his own previous record with a distance of 
 2004: Second Thrasher "Skater of the Year" award
 2005: First skateboarder to jump over the Great Wall of China on a skateboard (Way performed this jump with a broken foot after failing a practice jump the day before.)
 2005: "Big Air" Gold medal at X Games XI
 2006: "Big Air" Gold medal at X Games XII
 2006: First skateboarder to perform the "El Camino" ("rocket grab" backflip) skateboard trick on a mega ramp – Mexico City, Mexico
 2006: First skateboarder to drop into a ramp from the top of the guitar sculpture at the Hard Rock Cafe & Casino in Las Vegas, United States – a height of 
 2009: World record for land speed on a skateboard – assisted by professional skateboarder and entrepreneur Rob Dyrdek 
 2009: Winner of the inaugural "Big Air Rail Jam" event at X Games XV – Staples Center, Los Angeles, United States

Waiting for Lightning
In early 2012, a public announcement was released for a documentary in which Way's life is explored. Entitled Waiting for Lightning, the film focuses on the details of the first four decades of Way's life, including his childhood, the development that led to his career as a professional skateboarder, and a major project that was being constructed in China around the same time period that the documentary was being filmed.

Way embarked on a tour in support of the documentary that included presentations in Canada and Australia. While Way was in Australia to promote the film, Australian skateboard photographer Steve Gourlay created a portrait of Way standing at Federation Square in Melbourne, Australia. Way was also photographed at the Melbourne premiere with Australian vert skateboarders Dom Kekich and Tas Pappas.

Music
Way has been involved in numerous musical projects, such as "Escalera", a band formed with fellow professional skateboarder Bob Burnquist. Way revealed in the 2013 Jenkem interview that he had most recently collaborated with hip hop artists such as Mod Sun and Stevie J, explaining that he gravitates towards electronic and hip hop music producers. Way stated that his most recent collaborations have been "a good influence" in an educational sense, as his previous musical experiences have primarily involved guitar and "organic" instruments. An accompanying photograph for the published interview depicts Way seated in front of his home music studio.

Filmography
The Reality of Bob Burnquist (2005)    
The Man Who Souled the World (2007)
 ‘’X Games: The Movie’’ (2009)
Waiting For Lightning (2012)

Videography
Powell Peralta: Public Domain (1988) 
H-Street: Shackle Me Not (1988) 
Savannah Slamma III (1989)
Santa Cruz: Speed Freaks (1989) 
H-Street: Hokus Pokus (1989) 
All Pro Mini Ramp Jam Hawaiian Style (1990)
Plan B: Questionable (1992) 
Plan B: Virtual Reality (1993) 
Plan B: Second Hand Smoke (1994) 
XYZ: Stars & Bars (1995) 
Las Vegas Pro Vert '96 (1996)
 XYZ: Meet Your Maker (1997)
Plan B: The Revolution (1997)  
The XYZ Video (1999)
ON Video: Summer 2000 (2000)
 Tony Hawk’s Gigantic Skatepark Tour: Summer 2000 (2000)
Alien Workshop: Photosynthesis (2000) 
Collage (2001)
OP King of Skate (2002)
Thrasher: S.O.T.Y. Video (2003) 
Habitat: Mosaic (2003) 
411VM: Issue 60 (2003)
DC Shoes: The DC Video (2003) 
Transworld: Are You Alright? (2003)
DC Shoes: The DC Video (Deluxe Edition) (2004)
XYZ: Decade of Destruction (2005)    
XYZ: Decade of Destruction (2005)
Red Dragon: Skateboard Party (2005)
Plan B: Live After Death (2006) 
DC Shoes: Australia Tour (2006)
Transworld: Skate & Create (2008)
Plan B: In Dominican Republic (2008)
Plan B: Superfuture (2008) 
Plan B: In Arizona (2009)

Video game appearances
Way is a playable character in every installment of Electronic Arts' Skate series. In Skate and Skate It, he owns a fictional mega-skating park. He is also playable in the Konami video game Evolution Skateboarding as well as MTV Sports: Skateboarding Featuring Andy Macdonald.

Racing record

Complete FIA World Rallycross Championship results

Supercar

References

External links

 Danny Way Official Site 
 

1974 births
Living people
American skateboarders
X Games athletes
Sportspeople from Portland, Oregon
World Rallycross Championship drivers